was a town located in Kume District, Okayama Prefecture, Japan.

As of 2003, the town had an estimated population of 6,793 and a density of 88.13 persons per km2. The total area was 77.08 km2.

On March 22, 2005, Yanahara, along with the towns of Asahi and Chūō (all from Kume District), was merged to create the town of Misaki.

Dissolved municipalities of Okayama Prefecture